The Military Junta of 1963 or the Military Junta of Government was a military junta which governed the Republic of Ecuador from 1963 to 1966. Its members were Admiral Ramón Castro Jijón, General Marcos Gándara Enríquez, General Luis Cabrera Sevilla and General Guillermo Freire Posso.

The Military Junta of 1963 deposed President Carlos Julio Arosemena Monroy because of his support for politics of Cuba's Fidel Castro, which brought him into conflict with the National Congress and the Armed Forces, while the ensuing junta was characterized as being against the Cuban Revolution in international questions. The junta, composed by (originally) four members of the Armed Forces, was praised because of great reforms that it implemented, but also it was criticized because of authoritarianism and great repression that it enforced.

See also 
 1966 Ecuadorian Constitutional Assembly election

References

External links 
Instability and Military Dominance, 1960–72 – Dennis M. Hanratty, ed. Ecuador: A Country Study.

Military history of Ecuador
Political history of Ecuador
Government of Ecuador
Military dictatorships